Zephaniah Kingsley Sr. (April 11, 1734 – circa 1792) was an affluent British merchant, a loyalist during the American Revolution and one of the seven founders of the University of New Brunswick, Canada's oldest English language university. He was the father of slave trader and plantation owner Zephaniah Kingsley Jr. and the grandfather of Anna McNeill Whistler — better known as "Whistler's Mother" in the painting Arrangement in Grey and Black No.1 by her son (and Kingsley's great-grandson) James McNeill Whistler.

Early years
Son of Elizabeth Wright and Benjamin Kingsley, Zephaniah was born in Leake (Lincolnshire, England) into a third-generation family of Quakers. As a young man, he moved to London to become a cloth merchant. There he met Isabella Johnston (possibly of Dumfries, Scotland), whom he married in 1763 at the Church of St Mary LeBow, in London. After a brief stay in London, the couple moved to Bristol, where Kingsley established a retail business. In 1768, Kingsley filed for bankruptcy, and the family moved back to London the following year.

Colonial America and the American Revolution
Kingsley emigrated with his wife and children to Charlestown (Province of South Carolina) in December 1770. Within three years, he had become a successful merchant of imported goods, owning several high-end properties and entering into multiple business partnerships.

Kingsley remained loyal to Great Britain during the American Revolution. Before the fighting started, Kingsley endured many hardships as a result of his loyalty to the Crown. During the 1774 disturbances opposing the Tea Act, Kingsley (along with other merchants) was forced by a violent mob to dump his tea consignment into the water. Mobs intimidated loyalists, going house to house, tarring and feathering some, and pressuring them to leave. Despite such harassment, Kingsley refused to sign the loyalty oath required by the patriots.

Between 1775 and 1779, when the Continentals were in control of Charleston, Kingsley was imprisoned three times for refusing to bear arms against the Crown. By 1780, the British had regained control of Charleston. Kingsley was appointed to a commission that helped promote loyalty to the British government.

By 1782 the revolutionaries had regained Charleston and Kingsley's sizeable property (consisting of several townhouses and thousands of acres in the surrounding countryside) was confiscated. He was also banished from South Carolina by the Assembly. On December 14, 1782 Kingsley temporarily left for England in one of the last of the 300 British evacuation ships that left Charleston.

Canada
Back in Bristol, Kingsley obtained a new line of credit and in 1784 emigrated to Saint John in the newly created Colony of New Brunswick. There he sought, and obtained, land grants that the Crown gave to Loyalist refugees. He became a prominent businessman in the colony, owning many stores and importing his merchandise from Europe in his own ships. He also acquired townhouses in Saint John and Fredericton. By 1785, Kingsey was reunited with his family in New Brunswick.

Kingsley was very active in the social life of early New Brunswick. One of his ships (the True Briton) brought £500 in relief money from London that the London Quakers sent to assist needy Loyalist colonists.

On December 18, 1785, Kingsley and six other notable citizens petitioned Governor Thomas Carleton to establish "an academy or school of liberal arts and sciences at Fredericton". This eventually became Canada's oldest English language university, the University of New Brunswick.

Death
In 1791, the Kingsleys moved to Wilmington, North Carolina. Zephaniah Kingsley Sr. probably died a year later. His wife Isabella died in New York City on December 14, 1814, at age 77 and was buried at the Quakers' Houston Street Cemetery in Manhattan.

References

1734 births
1792 deaths
Colony of New Brunswick people
People from Lincolnshire
People from Wilmington, North Carolina
Businesspeople from Charleston, South Carolina
United Empire Loyalists